Orlando Chaves S.D.B. (17 February 1900 – 15 August 1981) was a Brazilian Roman Catholic archbishop.

Chaves was born in Brazil and was ordained to the priesthood in 1927. He served as bishop of the Roman Catholic Diocese of Corumbá, Brazil, from 1948 to 1956 and as archbishop of the Roman Catholic Archdiocese of Cuiabá, Brazil, from 1956 until his death in 1981.

Notes

1900 births
1981 deaths
20th-century Roman Catholic archbishops in Brazil
Salesian bishops
Roman Catholic archbishops of Cuiabá
Roman Catholic bishops of Corumbá